Steve Fox may refer to:

Steve Fox (American football), college football coach
Steve Fox (footballer) (1958–2012), English football player
Steve Fox (musician), Canadian country music singer
Steve Fox (politician) (born 1953), California politician
Steve Fox (Tekken), fictional British boxer in the Tekken fighting game series
Steve Fox, bass guitarist of Japanese musical group Godiego

See also
Stephen Fox (disambiguation)
Steven Fox (born 1978), American conductor of classical music
Steven Fox (golfer) (born 1991), American golfer